Kasuka Football Club is a football club from Brunei, that plays in the Brunei Super League.

History

Early days 
Due to the demand from the residents of Kampong Sungai Kedayan to play in the district league, Kasuka FC was founded in 1993. In the late 1990s and early 2000s, the club enjoyed a great deal of success. For the 1997–98 season, they won the Brunei-Muara District League and added the Police Cup (PRG) and Mukim Berakas Cup (Perbekal) to their collection of victories. By winning the District League Champions Cup, Pepsi Cup, and Community Shield of the District League in 1999, Kasuka added three more cups to their collection.

Further successes 
With the arrival of coach Moksen Mohammad in 2000, he would lead the team to win both the Brunei-Muara District League and the Pengiran Sengamara Di Raja Cup. According to Football Association of Brunei Darussalam (FABD), the club also won both the Mukim Kilanas Trophy and Md Amir PP competition in 2000. Under his guide, Kasuka continue to succeed with a 3–1 victory, against DPMM FC in the Malaysian Pepsi Cup that following year. Kasuka were one of the founding members of the B-League in 2002, where they ended the season in third place. They stayed in the top flight until the 2007–08 season when they withdrew from the competition with just two games left to play.

Reformation 

They reformed in 2014, winning promotion from the Brunei Premier League in 2015 into the Brunei Super League. Their highest position achieved was in the 2018-19 Super League season when they finished second behind MS ABDB. Managing to obtain an AFC Club License in late 2020, they were scheduled to participate in the qualifying stages of the 2021 AFC Cup, by virtue of their second place standing in the 2018-19 season. On 7 July 2021, AFC announced that the ASEAN Zone matches of the 2021 AFC Cup were cancelled, denying Kasuka of their continental debut.

In the year 2022, Kasuka strengthened their ranks further with the acquisition of several talents such as Adi Said, Azman Ilham Noor and Khairil Shahme Suhaimi to mount a serious challenge for the 2022 Brunei FA Cup, the only FABD competition to be contested for the year. They were even touted to be the favourites to win the competition when it commenced. They managed to go all the way to the final on 4 December when Kasuka initially had an early lead after Leon Sullivan Taylor scored the first goal of the match in the 13th minute. Azwan Ali Rahman equalised deep in first half stoppage time and Shah Razen Said subsequently netted the winner in the 70th minute to hand Kasuka defeat at the last hurdle of the tournament.

Current squad

Club officials

Honours 

 Brunei-Muara District League
 Champions (1): 1997–1998, 2000
 Brunei FA Cup
 Runners-up (1): 2022
 Pengiran Sengamara Di Raja Cup
 Champions (1): 2000
 Mukim Kilanas Trophy 
 Champions (1): 2000
 Md Amir PP
 Champions (1): 2000
 Brunei Pepsi Cup
 Champions (1): 2001
 Brunei Police Cup
 Champions (1): 1997
 Mukim Berakas Cup
 Champions (1): 1997

References

Association football clubs established in 1993
1993 establishments in Brunei
Football clubs in Brunei